The 1979 RTHK Top 10 Gold Songs Awards was held in 1979 for the 1978 music season.

Top 10 song awards
The top 10 songs (十大中文金曲) of 1979 are as follows.

References
 RTHK top 10 gold song awards 1979

RTHK Top 10 Gold Songs Awards
Rthk Top 10 Gold Songs Awards, 1979
Rthk Top 10 Gold Songs Awards, 1979